Karavannoye is a rural locality (a selo) and the administrative center of Karavannensky Selsoviet, Limansky District, Astrakhan Oblast, Russia. The population was 1,773 as of 2010. There are 10 streets.

Geography 
Karavannoye is located 33 km north of Liman (the district's administrative centre) by road. Mikhaylovka is the nearest rural locality.

References 

Rural localities in Limansky District